Stealing Second is the second solo album by American newgrass mandolinist Chris Thile, released in 1997 on Sugar Hill. All of the songs on Stealing Second were written by Thile.

Track listing
"Ah Spring" - 1:44
"Stealing Second" - 3:14
"Kneel Before Him" - 4:41
"Bittersweet Reel" - 5:04
"Alderaanian Melody" - 2:50
"Hyperdrive" - 3:38
"Leaves Fall" - 4:20
"A Night In Mos Eisley" - 2:50
"Hop The Fence" - 2:57
"The Game Is Afoot" - 6:38
"Clear The Tracks" - 3:02
"Golden Pond" - 3:11
"Road To Wrigley" - 3:22
"Ryno's Lament" - 2:25

Personnel

Musical
Chris Thile - bouzouki, mandolin
Russ Barenberg - guitar
Alison Brown - banjo
Sam Bush - fiddle, guitar, producer
Jerry Douglas - dobro
Stuart Duncan - fiddle
David Grier - guitar
Scott Thile - bass
Scott Vestal - banjo

Technical
Bradley Hartman - Engineer
Randy LeRoy - Mastering
Sue Meyer - Design

1997 albums
Chris Thile albums
Sugar Hill Records albums